Basketball competitions at the 2015 Pan American Games in Toronto were held from July 16 to 25 at the Ryerson Athletic Centre. A total of eight men's and women's teams competed in each tournament respectively.

Competition schedule

The following is the competition schedule for the basketball competitions:

Medal table

Medalists

Qualification
A total of eight men's teams and eight women's team will qualify to compete at the games. The top three teams at the South American and Central American and Caribbean Championships will qualify for each respective tournament. The host nation (Canada) along with the United States automatically qualifies teams in both events. Each nation may enter one team in each tournament (12 athletes per team) for a maximum total of 24 athletes.

Men

Women

Participating nations
A total of nine countries have qualified basketball teams.

See also
 Basketball at the 2016 Summer Olympics

References

 
basketball
2015
2015–16 in South American basketball
2015–16 in North American basketball
2015–16 in Canadian basketball
International basketball competitions hosted by Canada